Ivanka Das is an Indian actress, dancer, choreographer, model, and drag queen. She is known for her participation in the Indian reality television show Dance Deewane and the Netflix series Bombay Begums.

Early life
Das was born in Kolkata, and grew up in a conservative family in Mumbai and Kolkata. Both of her parents died during her childhood. She has said she always identified as female, and experienced gender dysphoria, but after visiting the Isckon temple of Lord Krishna, understood she is a woman, "and through that spirituality, I got inner power and felt I was reborn."

She moved to Delhi and began working as a choreographer, and also experienced illness and hair loss, ultimately shaving her head. She was then recruited to become a model and moved to Mumbai.

Career
Beginning in 2017, after an invitation from Keshav Suri of the Lalit hospitality chain, Das has worked as a dancer at the Kitty Su club in Chandigarh, and in Kitty Su drag nights nationwide. She also became a popular contestant on Dance Deewane.

In 2019, she was featured on an online cover of Vogue India as part of a celebration of the first anniversary of the Navtej Singh Johar v. Union of India decision that decriminalized consensual sexual conduct between adults.

In 2019, she debuted as an actress in the web series Ye Hai #Mandi, in the role of Kareena, a brothel owner. In 2020, she had a supporting role in the Netflix web series Bombay Begums as the character Beauty, a trans woman.

In 2020, she was featured in the MTV Beats Love Duet album song "Khud Ko Hi Paake" with Nikhita Gandhi.

In 2022, Ivanka was featured alongside Abhishek Bacchan, Shabana Azmi and others in the Bollywood film Ghoomer.

Television and web series

 Dance Deewane
 Ye Hai #Mandi
 Bombay Begums
 (Sonu Ka Dhaba) on Dangal TV 
 Ghoomer
 Haddi
 Maja ma
 Sunflower

References

External links

Transgender actresses
Indian actresses
 Year of birth missing (living people)
Actresses from Kolkata
Transgender drag performers
Reality dancing competition contestants
LGBT dancers
Transgender female models
Indian drag queens
Indian LGBT actors
Living people